Amar Singh Mangat (26 April 1935 – 28 September 2022) was a Kenyan field hockey player. He competed in the men's tournament at the 1964 Summer Olympics.

References

External links
 

1935 births
2022 deaths
Kenyan male field hockey players
Olympic field hockey players of Kenya
Field hockey players at the 1964 Summer Olympics
People from Nyeri County
Kenyan people of Indian descent
Kenyan people of Punjabi descent